We Only Make Believe is the first collaborative studio album by Conway Twitty and Loretta Lynn. It was released on February 1, 1971, by Decca Records.

This was the first of ten albums Twitty and Lynn would release. The album's first track is a cover of Twitty's solo hit "It's Only Make Believe", which Twitty co-wrote with Jack Nance. Lynn wrote two tracks for the album, "Don't Tell Me You're Sorry" and "We Closed Our Eyes to Shame". "I'm So Used to Loving You", another of Twitty's compositions, also appears on the album.

Critical reception

Billboard magazine's review of the album in the issue dated February 20, 1971, said, ""After the Fire Is Gone" on this LP is the hit, but Conway Twitty and Loretta Lynn reveal that they've established themselves as a major country duo. Standout tunes include "It's Only Make Believe" and a very sparkling "Pickin' Wild Mountain Berries" that has definite hit appeal. Good LP. Bound to sell big."

In the February 13, 1971 issue, Cashbox published a review on the album, which read, "Needless to say, Conway Twitty and Loretta Lynn are two of the most highly acclaimed country singers. Singularly, each has a string of hit records too numerous to name. Having already released a single together, "After the Fire Is Gone", which is currently on both the country and pop charts, We Only Make Believe is the duo's first album effort. Their first venture includes "We've Closed Our Eyes to Shame", "Don't Tell Me You're Sorry", "Take Me", "The One I Can't Live Without", and the Twitty classic now done with Loretta, "It's Only Make Believe". LP will establish Twitty and Lynn as one of the most popular and talented country duos of all time."

Record Worlds review of the album said, "This is the one everyone has been anticipating for weeks. The single, "After the Fire Is Gone," is already jumping into charts. Rock-a-billy fans will wig out over cut one, side two. Great album. "It's Only Make Believe", "Will You Visit Me on Sunday", "Pickin' Wild Mountain Berries", "Hangin' On", and "Working Girl"."

 Commercial performance 
The album peaked at No. 3 on the US Billboard Hot Country LPs chart and No. 78 on the US Billboard Top LPs, the duo's highest-charting album on that chart. The album was also certified Gold by the RIAA in 1988.

The album's first and only single, "After the Fire Is Gone", was released in January 1971 and peaked at No. 1 on the US Billboard Hot Country Singles chart at No. 56 on the US Billboard Hot 100. In Canada, the single peaked at No. 4 on the RPM Country Singles chart.

Recording
Recording sessions for the album took place on November 9, 10 and 11, 1970, at Bradley's Barn in Mount Juliet, Tennessee.

 Track listing 

Personnel
Adapted from the album liner notes and Decca recording session records.
Larry Barbier – photography
Harold Bradley – bass guitar
Owen Bradley – producer
Ray Edenton – acoustic guitar
John Hughey – steel guitar
Darrell Johnson – mastering
The Jordanaires – background vocals
Loretta Lynn – lead vocals
Tommy Markham – drums
Bob Moore – bass
Hargus Robbins – piano
Jerry Smith – piano
Conway Twitty – lead vocals
Herman Wade – electric guitar
Jim Williamson – engineer

 Charts AlbumSingles'

Certifications

References 

1971 albums
Vocal duet albums
Conway Twitty albums
Loretta Lynn albums
Albums produced by Owen Bradley
Decca Records albums